Dr. Sandip Prabhakar Dhurve (born 25 October 1966) is an Indian politician and Member of Legislative Assembly From Arni (ST) constituency. He belongs to Bhartiya Janata Party. His constituency is located in Yavatmal district.

Political Life
Sandeep Prabhakar Dhurve, a doctor by profession, started his political career in 2004. He defeated Shivajirao Moghe, a strong Congress leader and former minister from Kelapur (ST) (now Arni) assembly constituency. He was nominated by the Bharatiya Janata Party.
In 2014, when the Bharatiya Janata Party rejected his candidature, he contested the elections on the Shiv Sena's candidature. He was defeated.
In 2019, BJP once again nominated him. This time too, he defeated former minister Shivajirao Moghe and BJP rebel former MLA Raju Todsam.

Education
MBBS from Nagpur University, Government Medical College in 1991

References 

1996 births
Living people
Bharatiya Janata Party politicians from Maharashtra
Maharashtra politicians